Margaret Court and Virginia Wade were the defending champions but both players chose not to participate.

Chris Evert and Olga Morozova won in the final 6–4, 2–6, 6–1 against Gail Chanfreau and Katja Ebbinghaus.

Seeds

Draw

Finals

Top half

Bottom half

References

External links
1974 French Open – Women's draws and results at the International Tennis Federation

Women's Doubles
French Open by year – Women's doubles
1974 in women's tennis
1974 in French women's sport